West France was a European Parliament constituency. Created in 2003, it initially consisted of the French regions of Brittany and Pays de la Loire, with four departments of Nouvelle-Aquitaine (Charente, Charente-Maritime, Deux-Sèvres, and Vienne) being added in 2016. West France was made up of 6,177,138 electors in 2009. 

From 2004 until 2009, the constituency elected 10 Members of the European Parliament, while from 2009 until its abolition in 2019 it elected only 9.

Results

2009

2004

Brackets indicate the number of votes per seat won.

See also
 European Parliament election results for France in 2004

References 

Former European Parliament constituencies in France
Politics of Brittany
History of Pays de la Loire
Politics of Poitou-Charentes